Lot Norton (January 15, 1803 – May 29, 1880) was an American politician.

Norton, son of Lot and Mary (Hickok) Norton, was born in the village of Lakeville, in Salisbury, Conn, January 15, 1803. He graduated from Yale College in 1822. He settled as a farmer on his paternal estate, and lived there quietly through his life. In 1857 he was a member of the Connecticut State Legislature. On Saturday, May 29, 1880, he went to the village church to attend the public exercises in honor of Memorial Day, and fell dead as he was entering the building.

He was married, September 6, 1826, to Martha, daughter of Deacon Eliphalet Whittlesey, of Salisbury, who died October 29, 1867. Of their six children, two daughters and one son survived him.

External links

1803 births
1880 deaths
People from Lakeville, Connecticut
Yale College alumni
Members of the Connecticut General Assembly
19th-century American politicians